Suzuki MotoGP was the factory-backed team of Japanese motorcycle manufacturer Suzuki in the MotoGP World Championship, most recently using the name Team Suzuki Ecstar for sponsorship purposes. Suzuki withdrew from MotoGP competition at the conclusion of the 2022 season, winning their final race with Álex Rins.

History

1970s
In 1971, Grand Prix racer Jack Findlay and his business partner Daniele Fontana constructed a racing motorcycle using a Suzuki T series engine with a chassis of their own design. Findlay rode the motorcycle to victory in the 1971 Ulster Grand Prix marking the first victory for a Suzuki motorcycle in the premier 500cc class, as well as the first-ever 500cc class victory for a motorcycle powered by a two stroke engine.

The motorcycle was designed by Makoto Hase using the proven square-four, two stroke engine architecture that Suzuki had developed during their successful Grand Prix racing program in the 1960s. The RG 500 was proven successful in its first race at the 1974 500cc French Grand Prix when, Barry Sheene finished in second place behind the defending world champion, Phil Read. Sheene finished the season 6th overall with two wins.

Having developed the RG500, Suzuki ceded direct control of their Grand Prix racing program to their British importer, Suzuki GB in 1976 so that, they could concentrate on developing they first four stroke motorcycle, the Suzuki GS series. Teammate Steve Parrish was fifth.

In  with two wins on the new Suzuki RGA, Sheene finished second in the championship behind Yamaha rider Kenny Roberts. Teammate Wil Hartog was fourth overall, also won two races. The  championship was again won by Roberts with Virginio Ferrari finishing second, Barry Sheene third and Wil Hartog fourth, all riding the new Suzuki RGB.

1980s
While Yamaha rider Roberts won his third title, Suzuki riders Mamola was second, and Marco Lucchinelli third. Lucchinelli became the 500cc World Champion in  riding the new Suzuki RG 500 gamma for the Roberto Gallina racing team.

He was replaced on the Gallina team by Franco Uncini who went on to win the World Championship with five wins. Suzuki withdrew factory support at the end of the season.

While not a full-time return, riders Takumi Itoh and Kevin Schwantz had some good results aboard the new Suzuki RGV500. With a total of six wins, Schwantz was ranked fourth for the  season.

1990s
In  Schwantz was second overall with five wins while teammate Niall Mackenzie was 4th. Doug Chandler became Schwantz's teammate for  during which Schwantz enjoyed one win to finish the season fourth followed by Chandler's fifth place overall.

His new teammate Alex Barros also scored a win and finished 6th overall.

In , Schwantz was 4th overall with two wins whilst Barros was 8th. Early in the  season, Schwantz decided to retire from motorcycle competition. The other Suzuki rider Daryl Beattie finished the season second with two race wins.

Russell finished the season 6th while Beattie suffered serious injuries pre-season and did not have his previous form. He finished 18th. Beattie finished the season 11th and Gobert 15th. A fifth-place finish by Beattie was the team's best result that season.

Fujiwara however was injured during pre-season tests and Aoki contested the world championship alone. He finished 9th for the season with a best result of 4th place. Roberts Jr. took Suzuki's first win in the four years since 1995. His four wins gave him second place in the championship. Aoki was 13th.

2000s

In 2001 Sete Gibernau joined Roberts riding the Suzuki RGV500. Gibernau finished ninth overall and Roberts 11th.

In , the debut year of the new MotoGP class, Roberts and Gibernau rode the new Suzuki GSV-R four-stroke motorcycle. The team's best result was a 3rd-place podium finish by Roberts at the Brazilian Grand Prix. Overall, Roberts finished 9th and Gibernau 16th.

Hopkins came seventh at the Spanish Grand Prix. However, Roberts missed three races due to a crash in the Italian Grand Prix and finished the season 19th two places behind Hopkins in 17th place. The rider line-up remained the same for  while Bridgestone replaced Michelin as the team's tyre supplier. Hopkins finished the season 16th with Roberts Jr. again two places behind in 18th.

Roberts took a second place podium-finish in the wet British Grand Prix but finished the season 13th. Hopkins finished 14th for the season.

Hopkins finished the season 10th while Vermeulen finished 11th with a 2nd place podium-finish at the 2006 Australian Grand Prix.

Hopkins finished 4th with four podium finishes.

For 2008, Chris Vermeulen was joined by Loris Capirossi as the rider lineup and the same lineup remained in 2009.

2010s
For the 2010 season Álvaro Bautista joined the team.

For the 2011 season, the team fielded only one GSV-R for Bautista with no replacement for Loris Capirossi, who moved to the Pramac Racing team. At the end of 2011, Suzuki pulled out of MotoGP citing the need to reduce costs amid the global economic downturn.

In June 2013, Suzuki announced that they would return to MotoGP with a factory team in 2015. On 30 September 2014, Suzuki confirmed that it would participate in MotoGP from 2015, with Aleix Espargaró and Maverick Viñales as their two riders. They raced a newly developed MotoGP machine, the GSX-RR, with a restructured team organisation led by Davide Brivio.

2020s

In 2020, Suzuki secured the team's title for the first time, while rider Joan Mir secured the rider's title, becoming the first Suzuki rider to do so since Kenny Roberts Jr. in 2000.

On 12 May 2022, Suzuki announced they were "...in discussions with Dorna regarding the possibility of ending its participation in MotoGP at the end of 2022". Suzuki were reported to have contractual obligations to participate until 2026. Suzuki won two of their final three races in Australia and Valencia.

MotoGP results

By rider

By year
(key)

References

External links
 
 Suzuki Racing

Motorcycle racing teams
Motorsport in Japan
Motorcycle racing teams established in 1974
1974 establishments in Japan